Pablo Barrios Rivas (born 15 June 2003) is a Spanish professional footballer who plays as a midfielder for Atlético Madrid.

Club career
Barrios is a youth product of ED Moratalaz and Real Madrid, before moving to the academy of crosstown rivals Atlético Madrid in 2017. After working his way up their youth sides, he began his career with the reserves in January 2022.

On 3 March 2022, Barrios signed his first professional contract with Atleti, keeping him until 2025. He made his professional – and La Liga – debut on 29 October, coming on as a second-half substitute for Geoffrey Kondogbia in a 3–2 away loss to Cádiz CF.

Barrios scored his first goal for Atleti on 22 December 2022, netting his team's second in a 3–1 away win over CD Arenteiro, for the season's Copa del Rey. His first professional goal came on 4 January 2023, as he scored the second of Atlético's 2–0 win at Real Oviedo, also for the national cup.

On 25 January 2023, Barrios renewed his contract until 2028, and was officially promoted to the main squad, being assigned the number 24 jersey.

International career
Barrios is a youth international for Spain, having played up to the Spain U19s.

References

External links
 Profile at the Atlético Madrid website
 
 
 

2003 births
Living people
Footballers from Madrid
Spanish footballers
Association football midfielders
La Liga players
Segunda Federación players
Tercera Federación players
Atlético Madrid footballers
Atlético Madrid B players
Spain youth international footballers